This is a list of the main career statistics of Malaysian professional badminton player, Lee Chong Wei. To date, Lee has won a total of sixty-nine BWF singles titles including a record 42 BWF Super Series singles titles, and a record 4 BWF Super Series Finals. He is the first men's singles player to have won every BWF Super Series Premier title. Lee is also a triple Silver Medalist in men's singles, having reached the finals at the 2008 Beijing Olympics, 2012 London Olympics and 2016 Rio Olympics. He is also a quadruple Silver Medalist at the BWF World Championships. However, he was stripped of his achievement as the runner-up at the 2014 BWF World Championships due to doping violations. Following that matter, he served an 8-month suspension from international competitions.

Historic achievements 

Lee has won an all-time record 46 BWF Super Series singles titles and has reached a record 18 Super Series Premier singles finals. He is the only man to have won a career Super Series Premier (winning all six tournaments at least once). No player has won more Super Series than Lee. Lee is the only male player to win 3 consecutive BWF Super Series Finals titles (2008–10) and in the process won 18 consecutive matches at the year-end championships.

Lee has won 12 Malaysia Open titles, an all-time record. He is the only player in history to reach 14 Malaysia Open finals. He is the only player to win 2 different Super Series Premier 6 or more times (12 Malaysia Open and 6 Indonesia Open titles). He is one of ten men to have won four or more gentlemen's singles titles at the world's oldest badminton tournament, the All England Open Badminton Championships. Only Ralph Cyril Fulford Nichols (5), Frank Devlin (6), Lin Dan (6), Erland Kops (7) and Rudy Hartono (8) have won more All Englands than Lee. Lee is one of only four men to have reached the All England gentlemen's singles final at least seven times and reached at least six consecutive finals in the Open Era. He is also the oldest man to have won the All England in the Open Era.

Lee has spent 349 weeks as the No. 1 ranked player in the world (ranked No. 1 for 200 consecutive weeks), the most of any badminton player in history. Lee is the only player to rank No. 1 for more than 300 weeks, and the only player, male or female, to rank No. 1 for 200 consecutive weeks. He has won 64 BWF titles, second only to Lin Dan's 66.

In his prime years, Lee reached an unprecedented 9 major championships finals (1 Commonwealth Games, 1 Asian Games, 3 Olympic Games, and 4 World Championships) of a possible 11 events from 2008 to 2016. In the BWF Super Series Finals, Lee has won four titles in 5 finals, both records at the year-end tournament featuring the top eight players in the year-end rankings. He has qualified for the tournament a record 8 times, including a record 6 consecutive years from 2008 through 2013.

Lee's 2010 season is considered by most badminton experts to be one of the most excellent years since the beginning of the Open Era. He won nine singles titles and won the season-ending Super Series Finals. He won six Super Series events, winning 10 events of the 13 he entered, making the finals of all but two of the events. His overall record was 65–5.

Lee became the oldest No. 1 player on the BWF rankings list (aged 34) in June 2017.

Because of these many accomplishments, Lee is considered by many sports analysts to be one of the greatest badminton players of all time.

Significant finals

Olympic Games

World Championships

Commonwealth Games

Asian Games

Asian Championships

Southeast Asian Games

World Junior Championships

Other finals

BWF World Tour (1 title) 
The BWF World Tour, which was announced on 19 March 2017 and implemented in 2018, is a series of elite badminton tournaments sanctioned by the Badminton World Federation (BWF). The BWF World Tours are divided into levels of World Tour Finals, Super 1000, Super 750, Super 500, Super 300 (part of the HSBC World Tour), and the BWF Tour Super 100.

BWF Superseries (46 titles, 20 runners-up)  
The BWF Superseries, launched on 14 December 2006 and implemented in 2007, is a series of elite badminton tournaments, sanctioned by Badminton World Federation (BWF). BWF Superseries has two levels: Superseries and Superseries Premier. A season of Superseries features twelve tournaments around the world, which introduced since 2011, with successful players invited to the Superseries Finals held at the year end.

 BWF Superseries Finals tournament
 BWF Superseries Premier tournament
 BWF Superseries tournament

IBF/BWF Grand Prix (16 titles, 6 runners-up) 
The BWF Grand Prix had two levels, the BWF Grand Prix and Grand Prix Gold. It was a series of badminton tournaments sanctioned by the Badminton World Federation (BWF) which was held from 2007 to 2017. The World Badminton Grand Prix sanctioned by International Badminton Federation (IBF) from 1983 to 2006.

  BWF Grand Prix Gold tournament
  BWF & IBF Grand Prix tournament

BWF International Challenge/Series (1 title, 1 runner-up)

Invitational tournament

Team Badminton Leagues

League finals: 2 (1 championship) 

1 Lee was banned from playing in the 2013–2014 season of the China Badminton Super League after just three matches due to issues between the league's and Lee's personal sponsors.

Performance timeline 

To avoid confusion and double counting, these charts are updated at the conclusion of a tournament or when the player's participation has ended.

Singles 
This table is current through the 2018 Indonesia Open.

1 Held as BWF Super Series Finals from 2008–17, and BWF World Tour Finals from 2018 – present.
2 Held as China Masters until 2017, and Fuzhou China Open from 2018 – present.

Doubles 
This table is current through the 2018 Indonesia Open.

BWF ranking

BWF world No. 1 ranking

No. 1 stats

Weeks at No. 1 by span 

Ref.

Time spans holding the ranking

Age at first and last dates No. 1 ranking was held 

*all-time records

Weeks at No. 1 by decade

2000s

2010s

Ranking by year

During season 

Ref.

1 News reports have indicated that Lee amassed a total of 349 weeks as world No. 1, however, just the sum of Lee's known weeks as world No. 1 (from 21/08/2008) exceeds that figure, and this excludes the weeks he spent as world No. 1 in 2006 and earlier in 2008.
2 The discrepancy between weeks shown in the thumbnail (398) and that calculated above (407) is due to the difference between the unofficial unified ranking week count which began on 01/01/1990 and the official BWF World Ranking which began on 01/10/2009.

Coaches 
Misbun Sidek (1998–2005, 2007–2010, 2017–2019)Li Mao (2005–2007)Frederick Tan (Mental trainer) (2008–2010)Rashid Sidek (2010–2013)Tey Seu Bock (2010–2016)Hendrawan (2015–2019)

Record against other players

Record against top-10 players 
Lee's record against players who have been ranked world No. 10 or higher, with those who are active in boldface (as of 11 June 2019):

Record against players ranked No. 11–20 

Active players are in boldface.  

 Andrew Smith 9–0
 Ajay Jayaram 8–0
 Brice Leverdez 8–3
 Dicky Palyama 6–0
 Dionysius Hayom Rumbaka 6–0
 Kazumasa Sakai 5–0
 Hsu Jen-hao 5–1
 Chong Wei Feng 4–0
 Lee Dong-keun 4–0
 Kendrick Lee Yen Hui 4–0
 B. Sai Praneeth 4–1
 Arvind Bhat 3–0
 Qiao Bin 3–0
 Takuma Ueda 3–0
 Wei Nan 3–2
 Pablo Abián 2–0
 Gurusai Dutt 2–0
 Shōji Satō 2–0
 Andre Kurniawan Tedjono 2–0
 Alamsyah Yunus 2–0
 Anders Antonsen 1–0
 Chen Yuekun 1–0
 Jeon Hyeok-jin 1–0
 Ihsan Maulana Mustofa 1–0
 Khosit Phetpradab 1–0
 Sameer Verma 1–0
 Kantaphon Wangcharoen 1–0
 Kazushi Yamada 1–0

*

Top-10 wins

Negative records against other players 
Active players are in boldface.

BWF Tour career earnings 

* Statistics correct .

Longest winning streak

29 match winning streak 2011

Wins over top ranked opposition 
This list shows Lee's wins over the top ranked player in the world, or if he was world No. 1 himself, then the highest ranked player other than himself which is the world No. 2.

Career Super Series Premier tournament seedings 
The tournaments won by Lee are in boldface. Lee has been seeded first in 19 Super Series Premier tournaments, with 7 of those being consecutively (15 when excluding tournaments Lee did not contest). Also, he was seeded first or second in 22 consecutive Super Series Premiers he played in and was among the top 2 seeds for all the years that the Super Series Premier has been in existence after winning his first Super Series Premier (the 2011 All England Super Series Premier), through the 2017 Indonesia Super Series Premier. He has both won and been runner-up at tournaments when seeded 1st and 2nd.

Career milestone wins

Centennial match wins 

Bold indicates that he went on to win the tournament.

National representation

Team competitions finals: 12 (6 titles, 6 runners-up)

Olympic Games (3 silver)

(13 wins – 4 losses)

Singles (13–4)

Thomas Cup: 1

(26 wins – 3 losses) 

   indicates the result of the Thomas Cup match followed by the score, date, place of event, and its phase.

Sudirman Cup

(18 wins – 1 loss) 

   indicates the result of the Sudirman Cup match followed by the score, date, place of event, and its phase.

Asian Games: 1

(10 wins – 6 losses) 

   indicates the result of the Asian Games match followed by the score, date, place of event, and its phase.

Singles – Team (2–3)

Singles – Individual (8–3)

Commonwealth Games: 6 (5 titles)

(28 wins – 1 loss) 

   indicates the result of the Commonwealth Games match followed by the score, date and place of event.

Singles – Team (13–1)

Singles – Individual (15–0)

Wins: 5

Southeast Asian Games: 1 (1 title)

(4 wins – 2 losses) 

   indicates the result of the Southeast Asian Games match followed by the score, date and place of event.

Singles – Team (3–1)

Singles – Individual (1–1)

Wins: 1

Asia Team Championships

(3 wins – 0 loss) 

   indicates the result of the Asia Team Championships match followed by the score, date and place of event.

See also 
 Lee–Lin rivalry

References

External links 
 
 

Badminton career statistics
Badminton in Malaysia